Leif Evert Dahlgren (6 February 1906 – 16 April 1998) was a Swedish decathlete who won a silver medal at the 1934 European Championships. He competed at the 1936 Summer Olympics, but failed to finish.

Leif was the Swedish champions in pentathlon (1932, 1933, 1935, 1936), decathlon (1931–34), standing long jump (1933 and 1935) and 400 m hurdles (1934) and held the Swedish record in the standing long jump.

References

1906 births
1998 deaths
Swedish decathletes
Olympic athletes of Sweden
Athletes (track and field) at the 1936 Summer Olympics
European Athletics Championships medalists
Sportspeople from Lund